This is a list of piston engines developed by Nissan Motors.

Engine naming convention
Nissan uses a straightforward method of naming their automobile engines.  

The first few letters identify the engine family.  The following digits are the displacement in deciliters.  Finally, the trailing letters encode the main engine features, and are ordered based on the type of feature. Below is a list of encoded letters, and the engine features they represent. Make note, the first few letters in the engine name that identify the engine family have nothing to do with these encoded letters for the engine features, and should not be confused as such.

The encoded letters that represent engine features follow a specific order and not all features are necessarily listed all of the time. The basic, common features follow this general order:

[Engine family] [two-digit engine displacement in deciliters] [1] [2] [3] [4] [5] [6]

1 = Camshaft
2 = Fuel delivery
3 = Power delivery
4 = Power adder
5 = 2nd power adder
6 = Special

A good example to start with is the Nissan VG30DETT engine. It belongs to the VG engine family, displaces 30 deciliters (3.0 liters), and the feature letters describe an engine with dual overhead camshafts, electronic port fuel injection and two turbochargers.

The next example is the Nissan VQ35DE engine. It belongs to the VQ engine family and displaces 35 deciliters (3.5 liters). The feature letters describe an engine with dual overhead camshafts and electronic port fuel injection, but leaves off any power adder descriptors because it is a naturally aspirated engine. The (single) turbocharged version of the VQ displaces 30 deciliters (3.0 liters) and is logically called the VQ30DET.

Not all features are necessarily described in the name. For example, the SR20VE engine has dual overhead camshafts, but the variable valve lift design of the camshafts takes precedence in the naming scheme even though the "V" feature designation doesn't necessarily describe a DOHC arrangement. Many standard DOHC Nissan engines featured Variable Valve Timing, such as the VG30DETT, and as such do not use the "V" designation. The "V" designation is applied only if the engine has variable valve lift.

A good example of an engine where not all of the feature designation spots are used is the L28ET engine. The two features listed are electronic port fuel injection designated with the "E" and the presence of a turbocharger designed with the letter "T". The engine has a single overhead camshaft so there is no "D" listed in the name; the camshaft type designation place being left out completely. Nissan does not have a letter designation for the SOHC configuration so the camshaft configuration type is assumed as SOHC if no letter is present.

Another example is the MR16DDT engine, which has feature designations that describe an engine with dual overhead camshafts, direct cylinder fuel injection and a single turbocharger.

Lastly, there are engines built specifically as power generators for electric motors, designated with the lowercase "e". The HR14DDe engine is a good example of this, as this engine was purposely built for use with the EM57 electric motor as a power generator. The feature letters describe it as an engine with dual overhead camshafts, direct cylinder fuel injection with variable valve timing (bear in mind that the "V" designation is not used here, as that is used for variable valve lift) and is used as a power generator for electric motors.

Gasoline engines

Straight-3
 2010–present Nissan HR engine — 1.0/1.2/1.4 L — HR10DDT, HR10DE, HR12DE, HR12DDR, HR14DDe (See Straight-4 below for other HR engines)
 2014–present Nissan BR engine — 0.6/0.8/1.0 L — BR06DE, BR06DET, BR08DE, BR10DE
 2021–present Nissan KR engine — 1.5 L — KH5T, KR15DDT

Straight-4
Nissan's Straight-4 engines include:
 1931-1964 Datsun sidevalve engine — 495/722/747/860 cc — Type 7, Type 10, D-10, B-1
 1952–1966 Nissan D engine — 1.0/1.1/1.2 L — D/D10, D11, D12
 1955–1975 Prince G engine — 1.5/1.8/1.9/2.0 L — GA-4/G-1, GB-30/G-2, G-15, G-18
 1956–1960, 1962–present Nissan H engine — 1.9/2.0 L — H, H20 (See Straight-6 below for other H engines.)
 1957–1960 Nissan C engine — 1.0 L
 1958–1964, 1982–1988 Nissan E engine — 1.0/1.2/1.3/1.5/1.6 L — E, E-1, E10, E13, E15E, E15ET, E16, E16E
 1961–1970 Nissan G engine — 1.5 L — G
 1965–1970 Nissan R engine — 1.6 L — R16; K21, H20, H20 II.
 1965–1982 Nissan J engine — 1.3/1.5/2.0 L — J13, J15, J16
 1966–2010 Nissan A engine — 1.0/1.2/1.3/1.4/1.5 L — A10, A12, A12T, A12A, A13, A14, A15
 1967.5–1970 Datsun U engine — 2.0 L — U20; K20
 1968–1988 Nissan L engine — 1.3/1.4/1.6/1.8/2.0 L — L13, L14, L16, L18, L20B (See Straight-6 below for other L engines
 1979–1989 Nissan Z engine — 1.6/1.8/2.0/2.2/2.4 L — Z16, Z18, Z18ET, Z20S, Z20E, Z22E, Z24
 1982–1991 Nissan CA engine — 1.6/1.8/2.0 L — CA16, CA18i, CA18DE, CA18DET, CA18ET, CA20
 1983–1987 Nissan FJ engine — 2.0/2.4 L — FJ20E, FJ20ET, FJ24
 1983–1992 Nissan MA engine — 0.9/1.0/1.2 L — MA09ERT, MA10S, MA10E, MA10ET, MA12S
 1987–2013 Nissan GA engine — 1.3/1.4/1.5/1.6 L — GA14DE, GA16E, GA16DE, GA16DNE, GA16DS
 1987–2007 Nissan SR engine — 1.6/1.8/2.0 L — SR16DE, SR16Di, SR16D, SR16VE, SR16VE N1, SR18DE, SR18DET, SR18Di, SR20DE, SR20DE GT Spec, SR20DET, SR20Di, SR20VE, SR20VET
 1988–2004 Nissan KA engine — 2.0/2.4 L — KA20DE, KA24E, KA24DE
 1989 - 2015 Nissan NA engine — 1.6/2.0 L — NA16, NA20 - replacement of Z series and mostly used in commercial vehicles.  Designed based on Z series.
 1992–2002 Nissan CG engine — 1.0/1.3/1.4 L — CG10DE, CG13DE, CGA3DE
 1999–present Nissan QG engine — 1.3/1.5/1.6/1.8 L — QG13DE, QG15DE, QG16DE, QG18DE, QG18DD, QG18DEN
 2000–present Nissan QR engine — 2.0/2.5 L — QR20DE, QR20DD, QR25DE, QR25DD, QR25DER
 2002–present Nissan CR engine — 1.0/1.2/1.4 L — CR10DE, CR12DE, CR14DE
 2004–present Nissan MR engine — 1.6/1.8/2.0 L — MR16DDT, MR18DE, MRA8DE, MR20DE, MR20DD
 2010–present Nissan HR engine — 1.2/1.5/1.6 L — HR12DDT, HR15DE, HR16DE (See Straight-3 above for other HR engines)
 2017-present Nissan KR engine — 2.0 L — KR20DDET
 2019-present Nissan PR engine — 2.5 L — PR25DD

Straight-6
Nissan's Straight-6 engines include:
 1950–~1955 Nissan NAK engine — 3.7 L  
 1955–1956 Nissan NB engine — 3.7 L  
 1955–1959 Nissan NC engine — 4.0 L  
 1959–2003 Nissan P engine — 4.0 L — P40
 1963–1969 Prince G engine — 2.0/2.5 L — G-7/G7B-R, GR-8, G-11 (See Straight-4 above for other G engines)
 1965–1977 Nissan H engine — 3.0 L — H30 (See Straight-4 above for other H engines)
 1968–1973 Nissan S20 engine — 2.0 L
 1968–1986 Nissan L engine — 2.0/2.3/2.4/2.6/2.8 L — L20A, L20E, L20ET, L20P, L23, L24, L24E, L26, L26E, L28, L28E, L28ET (See Straight-4 above for other L engines)
 1985–2004 Nissan RB engine — 2.0/2.4/2.5/2.6/2.8/3.0 L — RB20E, RB20ET, RB20DE, RB20DET, RB20DET-R, RB24DET, RB25DE, RB25DET, RB26DE, RB26DETT, RB28DETT, RB30S, RB30E, RB30ET, RB30DE
 1987–present Nissan TB engine — 4.2/4.5/4.8 L — TB42E, TB42S, TB45E, TB48DE
 1999–2009 Nissan VX engine —

V6
Nissan's V6 engines include:
 1984–2004 Nissan VG engine — 2.0/3.0/3.3 L — VG20E, VG20P, VG20ET, VG20DE, VG20DET, VG30S, VG30i, VG30E, VG30ET, VG30DE, VG30DET, VG30DETT, VG33E, VG33ER
 1992–1994 Nissan VE engine — 3.0 L — VE30DE
 1995–present Nissan VQ engine — 2.0/2.3/2.5/3.0/3.5/3.7/3.8/4.0 L — VQ20DE, VQ23DE, VQ25DD, VQ25DE, VQ25DET, VQ25HR, VQ25VHR, VQ30DD, VQ30DE, VQ30DE-K, VQ30DET, VQ35DE, VQ35HR, VQ37VHR, VQ38HR, VQ40DE,
 2008–present Nissan VR Engine — 3.0/3.8 L — VR30DDTT, VR38DETT
 2015 - present Nissan VRX Racing Engine (Non-Production) — 3.0 L

V8
Nissan's V8 engines include:
 1965–1989 Nissan Y engine — 4.0/4.4 L — Y40, Y44
 1966–1967 Nissan W64 engine —6.4 L (Limited Production)
 1986-1987 Nissan VEJ30 engine —3.0 L (Non-Production)
 1987-1991 Nissan VRH Racing Engines — 3.0/3.4/3.5/5.0 L (Non-Production)
 1989–2001 Nissan VH engine — 4.1/4.5 L — VH41DE, VH45DE
 2001–present Nissan VK engine — 4.5/5.0/5.6 L — VK45DE, VK45DD, VK50VE, VK56DE, VK56VD

V12
Nissan's V12 engines include:

 1969–1970 GRX-III (Non-Production)— 6.0 L—Nissan R382, Nissan R383
 1991–1992 VRT35 (Non-Production)— 3.5 L

Diesel engines

Diesel Engines in summary (model, displacement)

 Nissan BD engine – 2.5/3.0 L
 Nissan CD engine – 1.7/2.0 L
 Nissan ED engine – 3.0/3.3, used on 1976 Nissan Clipper
 Nissan FD engine – 3.3/3.5/4.2/4.6 L
 Nissan LD engine – 2.0/2.8 L
 Nissan RD engine – 2.8 L
 Nissan SD engine – 2.0/2.2/2.3/2.5/3.3 L
 Nissan TD engine – 2.3/2.5/2.7/4.2 L
 Nissan YD engine – 2.2/2.5 L
 Nissan ZD engine – 3.0 L
 Nissan QD engine – 3.2 L
 Nissan M9R engine - 2.0 L
 Nissan M9T engine - 2.3 L
 Nissan V9X engine – 3.0 L
 Nissan UD engine - 1955-1983 – 3.7-14.8 L
 Nissan YS engine – 2.3 L

Wankel engine

Nissan showed a prototype Wankel rotary engine at the Tokyo Motor Show in 1972, but it never reached production.

Electric motors 
Nissans lineup of electric motors include:

 2010-2012 EM61
 2013 - present EM57
 2020 - present EM47

Glossary
 Nissan NAPS Nissan Anti Pollution System, predecessor to Nissan ECCS
 Nissan PLASMA ("purazuma") (Powerful ＆ Economic, Lightweight, Accurate, Silent, Mighty, Advanced) is an acronym for the engine series designed to counter Toyota's Lightweight Advanced Super Response Engine (LASRE).
 Nissan ECC is the Exhaust Gas Recirculator or EGR.
 Nissan ECCS ("eltukusu") Electronic Concentrated Control System (ECCS), or Electronic Gas Injector (EGI), is an electronic fuel injection system designed to improve fuel economy and to reduce exhaust emission.
N-VCT or Nissan Variable Cam Timing is an automobile variable valve timing technology. (NVCS)
NEO, or Nissan Ecology Oriented, is an engine technology used to reduce fuel consumption and emission output while improving overall engine performance.
CVTCS or Continuous Valve Timing Control System, is a Nissan automobile variable valve timing technology. The engine technology is used by Nissan to reduce fuel consumption and emission output while improving overall engine performance.
e-POWER for its line of series hybrid vehicles using an electric traction motor derived from the one used in the Nissan Leaf, which draws power from a battery and generator driven by a gasoline engine.
S-HYBRID for Smart and Simple micro hybrid vehicle powertrain with an auxiliary electric motor
VVL or Variable Valve and Lift is a Nissan automobile variable valve timing technology.
VVEL or Variable Valve Event and Lift is a Nissan automobile variable valve timing technology.

Nissan
 
Nissan